Renata Elisabeth Wielgosz was the Canadian ambassador to Greece and Cyprus.  She presented her credentials to Demetris Christofias of Cyprus on October 20, 2009.  Earlier, she had been Ambassador to Venezuela. Wielgosz has also been director of Global Affairs Canada.

References

 
Canadian women ambassadors
High Commissioners of Canada to Cyprus
Ambassadors of Canada to Greece
Ambassadors of Canada to Venezuela